Metolachlor  is an organic compound that is widely used as an herbicide.  It is a derivative of aniline and is a member of the chloroacetanilide family of herbicides.  It is highly effective toward grasses.

Agricultural use
Metolachlor was developed by Ciba-Geigy. Its acts by inhibition of elongases and of the geranylgeranyl pyrophosphate (GGPP) cyclases, which are part of the gibberellin pathway. It is used for grass and broadleaf weed control in corn, soybean, peanuts, sorghum, and cotton.  It is also used in combination with other herbicides.

Metolachlor is a popular herbicide in the United States.   As originally formulated metolachlor was applied as a racemate, a 1:1 mixture of the (S)- and (R)-stereoisomers. The (R)-enantiomer is less active, and modern production methods afford a higher concentration of S-metolachlor, thus current application rates are far lower than original formulations.

Production and basic structure
Metolachlor is produced from 2-ethyl-6-methylaniline (MEA) via condensation with methoxyacetone.  The resulting imine is hydrogenated to give primarily the S-stereoisomeric amine.  This secondary amine is acetylated with chloroacetylchloride. Because of the steric effects of the 2,6-disubstituted aniline, rotation about the aryl-C to N bond is restricted.  Thus, both the (R)- and the (S)-enantiomers exist as atropisomers.  Both atropisomers of (S)-metolachlor exhibit the same biological activity.

Safety and ecological effects 
Metolachlor has been detected in ground and surface waters in concentrations ranging from 0.08 to 4.5 parts per billion (ppb) throughout the U.S. It is classified as a Category C pesticide by the United States Environmental Protection Agency (US EPA), which indicates limited evidence of carcinogenicity. Evidence of the bioaccumulation of metolachlor in edible species of fish as well as its adverse effect on the growth and development raise concerns on its effects on human health. Though there is no set maximum concentration (maximum contaminant level, MCL) for metolachlor that is allowed in drinking water, the US EPA does have a health advisory level (HAL) of 0.525 mg/L.

Metolachlor induces cytotoxic and genotoxic effects in human lymphocytes. Genotoxic effects have also been observed in tadpoles exposed to metolachlor. Evidence also reveals that metolachlor affects cell growth. Cell division in yeast was reduced, and chicken embryos exposed to metolchlor showed a significant decrease in the average body mass compared to the control.

See also
Acetochlor
Alachlor
Josiphos ligands

References

External links
 

Herbicides
Acetanilides
Ethers
Organochlorides
Alkyl-substituted benzenes